This is a full list of episodes from the Playhouse Disney (2009–2011) and Disney Junior (2011–2012) TV series Jungle Junction.

Series overview

Episodes 
The episodes are listed in order of production.

Season 1 (2009–2011)

Season 2 (2011–2012)

DVD releases

References 

Lists of American children's animated television series episodes
Lists of Canadian children's animated television series episodes
Lists of Canadian animated television series episodes
Lists of British animated television series episodes
Lists of British children's television series episodes